The 1975 Brussels summit was the third NATO summit bringing the leaders of member nations together at the same time.  The formal sessions and informal meetings in Brussels, Belgium took place on 29–30 May 1975.  This event was only the third meeting of the NATO heads of state following the ceremonial signing of the North Atlantic Treaty on 4 April 1949.

Background
In this period, the organization faced a generational challenge; and the unresolved questions concerned whether  a new generation of leaders would be as committed to NATO as their predecessors had been.

Agenda
The general discussions focused on the need for affirming of the fundamental importance of the Alliance,  Other topics included, 
 Allied cohesion in the face of international economic pressures following the 1974 oil crisis; and
 Support for successful conclusion of negotiations in the framework of the Conference on Security and Cooperation in Europe (CSCE).

See also
 EU summit
 G8 summit

Notes

References
 Thomas, Ian Q.R. (1997).  The promise of alliance: NATO and the political imagination. Lanham: Rowman & Littlefield. ;

External links
  NATO update, 1975

1975 in politics
1975 Brussels summit
Diplomatic conferences in Belgium
20th-century diplomatic conferences
1975 conferences
1975 in international relations
1975 in Belgium
1970s in Brussels
Belgium and NATO
May 1975 events in Europe